William Joseph Brennan Jr. (April 25, 1906 – July 24, 1997) was an American lawyer and jurist who served as an Associate Justice of the Supreme Court of the United States from 1956 to 1990. He was the seventh-longest serving justice in Supreme Court history, and known for being a leader of the U.S. Supreme Court's liberal wing.

Born in Newark, New Jersey, Brennan studied economics at the University of Pennsylvania, then attended Harvard Law School. He entered private legal practice in New Jersey and served in the U.S. Army during World War II. He was appointed in 1951 to the Supreme Court of New Jersey. Shortly before the 1956 presidential election, President Dwight D. Eisenhower used a recess appointment to place Brennan on the Supreme Court. Brennan won Senate confirmation the following year. He remained on the Court until his retirement in 1990, and was succeeded by David Souter.

On the Supreme Court, Brennan was known for his outspoken progressive views, including opposition to the death penalty as he dissented in more than 1,400 cases in which the Supreme Court refused to review a death sentence, and support for abortion rights and gay rights. He authored several landmark case opinions, including Baker v. Carr (1962), establishing that the apportionment of legislative districts is a justiciable issue, Eisenstadt v. Baird (1972), which made contraception legal for unmarried people and helped solidify the sexual revolution, Craig v. Boren (1976) which established that laws which discriminate on the basis of sex are subject to heightened scrutiny under the Equal Protection Clause, and New York Times Co. v. Sullivan (1964), which required "actual malice" in libel suits brought by public officials.

Due to his ability to shape a variety of wide opinions and "bargain" for votes in many cases, he was considered to be among the Court's most influential members. Justice Antonin Scalia called Brennan "probably the most influential Justice of the [20th] century."

Early life and education
William J. Brennan Jr. was born on April 25, 1906, in Newark, New Jersey, the second of eight children. Both his parents, William and Agnes (McDermott) Brennan, were Irish immigrants. They met in the United States, although both were originally from County Roscommon in Ireland. William Brennan, Sr. had little education and worked as a metal polisher, but rose to a position of leadership, serving as the Commissioner of Public Safety for the city of Newark from 1927 to 1930.

Brennan attended public schools in Newark, and graduated from Barringer High School in 1924. He then attended the Wharton School of the University of Pennsylvania, where he graduated cum laude with a degree in economics in 1928. While there, he joined Delta Tau Delta fraternity. Brennan graduated from Harvard Law School near the top of his class in 1931 and was a member of the Harvard Legal Aid Bureau.

When he was 21, Brennan married Marjorie Leonard, whom he had met in high school. They eventually had three children: William III, Nancy, and Hugh.

Early legal career
After graduating from Harvard Law School, Brennan entered private practice in his home state of New Jersey, where he practiced labor law at the firm of Pitney Hardin (which would later become Day Pitney). During World War II, Brennan was commissioned in the Army as a major in March 1942, and left as a colonel in 1945. He did legal work for the ordnance division. In 1949, Brennan was appointed to the Superior Court (a trial court) by Governor of New Jersey Alfred E. Driscoll. In 1951, Driscoll appointed him to the Supreme Court of New Jersey.

Supreme Court

Supreme Court appointment
Brennan was given a recess appointment as an associate justice of the United States Supreme Court by President Dwight D. Eisenhower on October 15, 1956, shortly before the 1956 presidential election, and was sworn into office the following day. The president's advisers thought the appointment of a Roman Catholic Democrat from the Northeast would woo critical voters in the upcoming re-election campaign for Eisenhower, a Republican. Brennan was also strongly supported by Cardinal Francis Spellman.

Brennan gained the attention of Herbert Brownell, United States Attorney General and Eisenhower's chief legal affairs adviser, when Brennan had to give a speech at a conference (as a substitute for New Jersey Supreme Court Chief Justice Arthur Vanderbilt). To Brownell, Brennan's speech seemed to suggest a marked conservatism, especially on criminal matters.

His nomination, formally submitted to the Senate Judiciary Committee on January 14, 1957, faced a small amount of controversy from two angles. The National Liberal League opposed the nomination of a Catholic, thinking he would rely on his religious beliefs rather than the Constitution when ruling, and Senator Joseph McCarthy had read transcripts of Brennan's speech where he decried overzealous anti-Communist investigations as "witch-hunts." After a confirmation hearing in which Brennan defended himself against McCarthy's attacks and proclaimed that he would rule solely on the basis of the Constitution and not on Church law, he was confirmed by a near-unanimous vote, with only Senator McCarthy voting against him.

Other factors playing into Brennan's appointment were his status as a state court judge – no state judge had been appointed to the High Court since Benjamin N. Cardozo in 1932 – and Eisenhower's desire to appear bipartisan after his appointments of two Republicans: Earl Warren (former Governor of California) and John Marshall Harlan II.

Brennan filled the seat vacated by Justice Sherman Minton. He held the post until his retirement on July 20, 1990, for health reasons; he was succeeded on the Court by Justice David Souter. He was the last federal judge in active service to have been appointed to his position by President Eisenhower. Brennan then taught at Georgetown University Law Center until 1994. With 1,360 opinions, he is second only to William O. Douglas in number of opinions written while a Supreme Court justice.

Warren Court
An outspoken liberal throughout his career, he played a leading role in the Warren Court's expansion of individual rights. Brennan played a behind-the-scenes role during the Warren Court, coaxing more conservative colleagues to join the Court's decisions. Brennan's opinions with respect to voting (Baker v. Carr), criminal proceedings (Malloy v. Hogan), the free speech and establishment clauses of the First Amendment (Roth v. United States), and civil rights (Green v. County School Board of New Kent County) were some of the most important opinions of the Warren Era. Brennan's role in expanding free speech rights under the First Amendment is particularly notable, as he wrote the Court's opinion in 1964's New York Times Co. v. Sullivan, which created constitutional restrictions on the law of libel. It was Brennan who coined the phrase "chilling effect", in 1965's Dombrowski v. Pfister. His close friendship with Chief Justice Warren, who frequently assigned Brennan the task of writing the majority opinion, led to the other justices nicknaming him the "deputy Chief".

In the 1962-1963 term, one of Brennan's law clerks was Richard A. Posner, who later became a founder of the field of Law and Economics and one of the most influential legal scholars in the United States.

Burger and Rehnquist Courts
On the less liberal Burger Court, Brennan was a staunch opponent of the death penalty and a supporter of abortion rights and joined the majority in landmark rulings on both issues (Furman v. Georgia (1972) on the death penalty and Roe v. Wade (1973) on abortion). With the ascension of the most conservative member of the court, William Rehnquist, to the position of Chief Justice, and the replacement of Warren Burger and the moderate Lewis Powell with Antonin Scalia and Anthony Kennedy, Brennan found himself more frequently isolated. At times, his opinions would be joined only by Thurgood Marshall since, by 1975, they were the last remaining liberals of the Warren Court. That like-mindedness led to both Brennan and Marshall's clerks referring to them as “Justice Brennan-Marshall” in the face of the court's heavy conservative opposition to the two. Brennan declared in Furman that he believed the death penalty violated the Eighth Amendment's prohibition on “cruel and unusual” punishment, and for his remaining years on the bench, he and Marshall dissented from every case upholding the imposition of the death penalty. He was able to convince no other justice of this view, but Justice Harry Blackmun would eventually agree in 1994, after Brennan's retirement.

Brennan authored three Supreme Court opinions holding that a plaintiff has a cause of action for money damages (compensatory and punitive) arising solely out of an alleged violation of the Bill of Rights. In Bivens v. Six Unknown Named Agents, Brennan so held with respect to the Unreasonable Search and Seizure clause of the Fourth Amendment. In Davis v. Passman, Brennan extended this rationale to the equal protection component of the Due Process Clause of the Fifth Amendment, in a suit for gender discrimination in employment against a former Congressman (Congressional staffers were explicitly excluded from Title VII of the Civil Rights Act). In Carlson v. Green, Brennan extended this rationale again to the Cruel and Unusual Punishment clause of the Eighth Amendment, in a suit by the estate of a deceased federal prisoner (even though the plaintiff also had a cause of action under the Federal Tort Claims Act).

During the same period, Brennan began to adopt and promote a coherent and expansive vision of personal jurisdiction. He authored the sole dissent in Helicopteros Nacionales de Colombia, S. A. v. Hall, defining minimum contacts very broadly for the purposes of general jurisdiction, and influential dissents and partial concurrences in World-Wide Volkswagen Corp. v. Woodson and Asahi Metal Industry Co. v. Superior Court on the subject of specific jurisdiction, holding to a simple "stream-of-commerce" analysis for product liability cases and emphasizing the role of fairness in the Court's analysis of the holding in International Shoe Co. v. Washington. The upshot of Brennan's analysis is an expansion of the jurisdiction of state courts, particularly over corporations; state courts are typically more sympathetic to small, weak plaintiffs than to large, powerful corporate defendants. In this process, he frequently clashed with Justice Scalia over this issue, and uncharacteristically dissented from Justice Marshall's majority opinion on the subject in Shaffer v. Heitner.

In his penultimate and final terms on the Court, he wrote the controversial rulings for Texas v. Johnson and United States v. Eichman, respectively. In both cases, the Court held that the First Amendment protects desecration of the United States flag.

Brennan's wife Marjorie died in December 1982. Slightly more than three months later, in March 1983 at age 77, he married Mary Fowler, who had served as his secretary for 26 years. Brennan's colleagues learned of his second marriage via a short office memo stating, "Mary Fowler and I were married yesterday and we have gone to Bermuda."

Judicial philosophy
Brennan strongly believed in the Bill of Rights, arguing early on in his career that it should be applied to the states in addition to the federal government. He often took positions in favor of individual rights against the state, favoring criminal defendants, minorities, the poor, and other underrepresented groups. Furthermore, he generally shied away from the absolutist liberal positions of Justices Hugo Black and William O. Douglas, being very amenable to compromise in order to win a majority of Justices. Brennan's conservative detractors charged that he was a purveyor of judicial activism, accusing him of deciding outcomes before coming up with a legal rationale for them. At his retirement, Brennan said the case he thought was most important was Goldberg v. Kelly, which ruled that a local, state or federal government could not terminate welfare payments to a person without a prior individual evidentiary hearing.

In the 1980s, as the Reagan administration and the Rehnquist Court threatened to "roll back" the decisions of the Warren Court, Brennan became more vocal about his jurisprudential views. In a 1985 speech at Georgetown University, Brennan criticized Attorney General Edwin Meese's call for a "jurisprudence of original intention" as "arrogance cloaked as humility" and advocated reading the U.S. Constitution to protect rights of "human dignity".

Brennan was also less interested in stare decisis or the avoidance of "absolutist" positions where the death penalty was concerned, as he believed that the deliberate taking of human life by the state, as a punishment, was inherently cruel and unusual.  Brennan and Thurgood Marshall, Brennan's closest ally in the Court, concluded in Furman v. Georgia that the death penalty was, in all circumstances, unconstitutional, and never accepted the legitimacy of Gregg v. Georgia, which ruled that the death penalty was constitutional four years later. Thereafter, Brennan or Marshall took turns, joined by the other, in issuing a dissent in every denial of certiorari in a capital case, and from every decision in a case which the Court did take which failed to vacate a sentence of death.

Brennan also authored a dissent from the denial of certiorari in Glass v. Louisiana. In Glass, the Court chose not to hear a case that challenged the constitutionality of the use of the electric chair as a form of execution. Brennan wrote:

Th[e] evidence suggests that death by electrical current is extremely violent and inflicts pain and indignities far beyond the "mere extinguishment of life". Witnesses routinely report that, when the switch is thrown, the condemned prisoner "cringes," "leaps," and "fights the straps with amazing strength." "The hands turn red, then white, and the cords of the neck stand out like steel bands." The prisoner's limbs, fingers, toes, and face are severely contorted. The force of the electrical current is so powerful that the prisoner's eyeballs sometimes pop out and "rest on [his] cheeks." The prisoner often defecates, urinates, and vomits blood and drool.

Brennan concluded by stating that electrocution is "nothing less than the contemporary technological equivalent of burning people at the stake." Brennan voted with the majority in Roe v Wade which legalized abortion nationally and helped craft the decision.  Brennan wrote the majority opinion in Roth v. United States which set new standards for obscenity laws, allowing some prosecutions, but drastically loosening the laws overall. He later reversed his position in dissent in Miller v. California arguing that obscenity laws were unconstitutional. Although Brennan joined the majority in United States v. O’Brien which upheld the constitutionality of laws banning draft card burning, he later opposed the Vietnam War and dissented several times when the Supreme Court refused to hear challenges to its legality. In a dissent in San Antonio Independent School District v. Rodriguez Brennan argued that unequal funding of poor and wealthy school districts violated the Equal Protection Clause. Brennan supported gay rights.  He joined the dissent in Bowers v. Hardwick, which allowed states to prosecute consensual homosexual sodomy. 
In a dissent from a denial of certiorari in 1985 involving a lesbian teacher fired for her sexual orientation, Brennan publicly criticized homophobia, writing "Homosexuals have historically been the object of deep and sustained pernicious hostility, and it is fair to say that discrimination against homosexuals is likely to reflect deep-seated prejudice rather than rationality."' 
He is regarded as one of the most liberal justices in the history of the court.

Quotes

 "We current Justices read the Constitution in the only way that we can: as twentieth century Americans. We look to the history of the time of framing and to the intervening history of interpretation. But the ultimate question must be, what do the words of the text mean in our time. For the genius of the Constitution rests not in any static meaning it might have had in a world that is dead and gone, but in the adaptability of its great principles to cope with current problems and current needs."
 "The nations of the world, faced with sudden threats to their own security, will look to Israel's experience in handling its continuing security crisis, and may well find in that experience the expertise to reject the security claims that Israel has exposed as baseless and the courage to preserve the civil liberties that Israel has preserved without detriment to its security."
 "Successive generations of Americans have continued to respect these fundamental choices and adopt them as their own guide to evaluating quite different historical practices. Each generation has the choice to overrule or add to the fundamental principles enunciated by the Framers; the Constitution can be amended or it can be ignored."
 "The constitutional vision of human dignity rejects the possibility of political orthodoxy imposed from above; it respects the right of each individual to form and to express political judgments, however far they may deviate from the mainstream and however unsettling they might be to the powerful or the elite."
 "The dissemination of ideas can accomplish nothing if otherwise willing addressees are not free to receive and consider them. It would be a barren marketplace of ideas that had only sellers and no buyers." Lamont v. Postmaster General, 381 U.S. 301 (1965) (concurring).
 "Sex, a great and mysterious motive force in human life, has indisputably been a subject of absorbing interest to mankind through the ages." Roth v. United States, 354 U.S. 476 (1957).
 "[W]e consider this case against the background of a profound national commitment to the principle that debate on public issues should be uninhibited, robust, and wide-open, and that it may well include vehement, caustic, and sometimes unpleasantly sharp attacks on government and public officials." New York Times Co. v. Sullivan, 376 U.S. 254 (1964).
 "I cannot accept the notion that lawyers are one of the punishments a person receives merely for being accused of a crime." Jones v. Barnes, 463 U.S. 745, 764 (1983) (dissenting).
 "Those whom we would banish from society or from the human community itself often speak in too faint a voice to be heard above society's demand for punishment. It is the particular role of courts to hear these voices, for the Constitution declares that the majoritarian chorus may not alone dictate the conditions of social life." McCleskey v. Kemp, 481 U.S. 279 (1987) (dissenting).
 "The Court next states that its unwillingness to regard petitioner's evidence as sufficient is based in part on the fear that recognition of McCleskey's claim would open the door to widespread challenges to all aspects of criminal sentencing...Taken on its face, such a statement seems to suggest a fear of too much justice." McCleskey v. Kemp, 481 U.S. 279 (1987) (dissenting).
 "If the Court had struck down legislative prayer today, it would likely have stimulated a furious reaction. But it would also, I am convinced, have invigorated both the 'spirit of religion' and the 'spirit of freedom.'" Marsh v. Chambers, 463 U.S. 783 (1983) (dissenting).
 "If the right of privacy means anything, it is the right of the individual, married or single, to be free from unwarranted governmental intrusion into matters so fundamentally affecting a person as the decision whether to bear or beget a child." Eisenstadt v. Baird, 405 U.S. 438 (1972).
 "We can imagine no more appropriate response to burning a flag than waving one's own, no better way to counter a flag burner's message than by saluting the flag that burns, no surer means of preserving the dignity even of the flag that burned than by – as one witness here did – according its remains a respectful burial. We do not consecrate the flag by punishing its desecration, for in doing so we dilute the freedom that this cherished emblem represents." Texas v. Johnson, 491 U.S. 397 (1989).

Honors and awards
As a result of his long and distinguished career on the United States Supreme Court, Brennan was honored with many different awards. In 1969, he was awarded the Laetare Medal by the University of Notre Dame, considered the most prestigious award for American Catholics. In 1987, Brennan received the U.S. Senator John Heinz Award for Greatest Public Service by an Elected or Appointed Official, an award given out annually by Jefferson Awards. In 1989, the historic Hudson County Courthouse in Jersey City, New Jersey, which had opened in 1910, was renamed the William J. Brennan Court House in his honor and, in that same year, he received the Freedom Medal. On November 30, 1993, President Bill Clinton presented Brennan with the Presidential Medal of Freedom.

Upon his death, Brennan lay in repose in the Great Hall of the United States Supreme Court Building.

Years after his death, in 2010, Brennan was inducted into the New Jersey Hall of Fame and William J. Brennan High School was founded in San Antonio, Texas, honoring him. Brennan Park across from the historic Essex County Veterans Courthouse in Newark, New Jersey, was named in Brennan's honor and a statue of him was erected in front of the Essex County Hall of Records by historian Guy Sterling.

See also
 Brennan Center for Justice
 List of justices of the Supreme Court of the United States
 List of law clerks of the Supreme Court of the United States (Seat 3)
 List of United States Supreme Court justices by time in office
 United States Supreme Court cases during the Burger Court
 United States Supreme Court cases during the Rehnquist Court
 United States Supreme Court cases during the Warren Court
 William J. Brennan Award

Notes

References

Sources

 
 
 
 
 
 
 
 
 Stern, Seth, and Stephen Wermiel. Justice Brennan: liberal champion (Houghton Mifflin Harcourt, 2010), 674 pages; detailed scholarly biography
 
 
 
 Wermiel, Stephen, and Seth Stern. Justice Brennan: Liberal Champion (Houghton Mifflin Harcourt, 2010) 688pp excerpt and text search , based on Brennan's case notes and 50 hours of interviews
 Remarks by the President in Ceremony Honoring Medal of Freedom Recipients – November 30, 1993 

Further reading
 Caballero, Raymond. McCarthyism vs. Clinton Jencks.'' Norman: University of Oklahoma Press, 2019.

External links

 
 William Brennan Jr. FBI file at vault.fbi.gov
 
Arlington National Cemetery

1906 births
1997 deaths
People from Newark, New Jersey
Wharton School of the University of Pennsylvania alumni
20th-century American judges
American legal scholars
American people of Irish descent
Barringer High School alumni
Georgetown University Law Center faculty
Harvard Law School alumni
Laetare Medal recipients
New Jersey Democrats
New Jersey lawyers
New Jersey state court judges
Justices of the Supreme Court of New Jersey
Lawyers from Newark, New Jersey
Presidential Medal of Freedom recipients
Recess appointments
United States Army officers
United States Army personnel of World War II
United States federal judges appointed by Dwight D. Eisenhower
Justices of the Supreme Court of the United States